Jacaranda caroba, the Brazilian caroba-tree, is a medicinal plant native to Cerrado vegetation in Brazil.

References

External links

Jacaranda caroba, Brazilian Caroba-tree
A Modern Herbal- Jacaranda Caroba tree

caroba
Trees of Brazil
Flora of the Cerrado
Medicinal plants of South America